Rudolph Larriva (February 12, 1916 – February 19, 2010) was an American animator and director from the 1940s to the 1980s.

Early life
Born in El Paso, Texas, which his parents moved out at the age of two, he attended several grammar schools, and graduated from John C. Fremont High School with a major in commercial art, but never went to college. He was of Mexican descent.

Career
Larriva worked at a number of studios, including Format Films, Filmation, and Walt Disney Productions, but is best known for his work at Warner Bros. Cartoons and UPA. He was an animator in Chuck Jones' unit, starting in 1939 with the short Dog Gone Modern. He later animated for shorts like Elmer's Pet Rabbit and Porky's Cafe. Larriva was considered by Jones to be his top animator in the late 1930s and early 1940s, where he particularly delivered Disney-quality animation.

Some of the productions he worked on include the 1965-1967 Looney Tunes and Merrie Melodies cartoons for Format Films, Song of the South, Mr. Magoo (the first short, "The Ragtime Bear"), Gerald McBoing Boing, Fangface, The Alvin Show and The Lone Ranger. He was also the animation director of The Twilight Zone opening titles for 1959–1960.

He died in Irvine, California on February 19, 2010, aged 94. Larriva was buried in Eternal Hills Cemetery in Oceanside, California in March of that year. He is survived by his son and his three grandchildren.

Note: The Wile E. Coyote/Road Runner cartoons in the above list are sometimes called the "Larriva Eleven."

References

External links
 
Opening Title, Season One of The Twilight Zone

1916 births
2010 deaths
Animators from Texas
American animated film directors
People from El Paso, Texas
Walt Disney Animation Studios people
Warner Bros. Cartoons people
John C. Fremont High School alumni